The following radio stations broadcast on AM frequency 940 kHz: 940 AM is a Mexican and Canadian clear-channel frequency.  XEQ Mexico City is the dominant Class A clear channel station on 940 kHz. See also List of broadcast station classes.  CFNV in Montreal, Quebec is also a Class A station.

In Argentina 
 Excelsior in Monte Grande, Buenos Aires.
 LRH200 in Chajarí, Entre Ríos.
 LRJ241 Dimensión in San Luis.

In Canada 
Bold print of Call Letters indicates Class A

In Mexico 
Stations in bold are clear-channel stations.
 XEQ-AM in Iztapalapa, DF - 30 kW, transmitter located at 
 XEMMM-AM in Mexicali, Baja California

In the United States

References

Lists of radio stations by frequency